Grindelia pusilla, the little gumweed, is a North American species of flowering plants in the family Asteraceae. It is found only in the state of Texas in the south-central United States.

Grindelia pusilla grows in open, dry sites, often disturbed. The plant usually produces numerous flower heads in flat-topped arrays. Each head has 13-27 ray flowers, surrounding a large number of tiny disc flowers.

References

pusilla
Endemic flora of Texas
Plants described in 1934
Flora without expected TNC conservation status